The Love Habit is a 1931 British comedy film directed by Harry Lachman and starring Seymour Hicks, Margot Grahame and Edmund Breon. It was made at Elstree Studios with production beginning in August 1930. Produced by British International Pictures, the largest British film company of the time, it was released in January the following year. It was based on a French play Pour avoir Adrienne by Louis Verneuil.

Cast
 Seymour Hicks as Justin Abelard  
 Margot Grahame as Julie Bubois 
 Edmund Breon as Alphonse Dubois 
 Ursula Jeans as Rose Pom Pom 
 Clifford Heatherley as Santorelli  
 Walter Armitage as Max Quattro  
 Elsa Lanchester as Mathilde

References

Bibliography
 Low, Rachael. Filmmaking in 1930s Britain. George Allen & Unwin, 1985.
 Wood, Linda. British Films, 1927-1939. British Film Institute, 1986.

External links

1931 films
British comedy films
1931 comedy films
Films shot at British International Pictures Studios
Films directed by Harry Lachman
British films based on plays
Films based on works by Louis Verneuil
British black-and-white films
1930s English-language films
1930s British films